Provincial road N305 (N305) is a road connecting Rijksweg 6 (A6) in Almere with N307 in Dronten.

External links

305
305